In paleontology, a chimera is a fossil that was reconstructed with elements coming from more than a single species or genus of animal. In other words they are mistakes or sometimes hoaxes made by paleontologists, putting together parts that do not come from the same organism.  A now classic example of chimera is Protoavis.

List of paleontological chimeras
 Archaeoraptor
 Dalianraptor?
 Lametasaurus?
 Protoavis
 Piltdown Man
 Ultrasauros
 Ornithopsis hulkei
 Teihivenator
 Dakotaraptor?
 Avalonianus
 Kootenichela?
 Polacanthoides?

References